Roadside is a small village, located at the junction of the A9 trunk road and the B874, 1 mile south of Sordale in Caithness, Scottish Highlands and is in the Scottish council area of Highland.

Populated places in Caithness